Thomas Boynton  (d.1919) was a British antiquarian from Bridlington.

Biography
Until 1880 Boynton was a farmer. When drainage works ran through his farmland near Holderness in 1880, he identified and subsequently excavated a series of Prehistoric settlements. These discoveries were initially reported in several newspaper articles between 1883 and 1885.

Boynton excavated the Iron Age cemetery site of Danes Graves, alongside William Greenwell and  John Robert Mortimer, in 1897–1898.

Boynton served as a Vice-President of the Yorkshire Philosophical Society and as Honorary Curator of Antiquities. During his time as Honorary Curator he donated his collection of regional ceramics to the Yorkshire Museum and also acquired chariot wheels from the Arras Culture chariot-burial tradition for it. He served on the council of the Yorkshire Archaeological and Historical Society. He was elected as a Fellow of the Society of Antiquaries of Scotland in 1884, and a Fellow of the Society of Antiquaries of London in 1895.

Select publications
Boynton, T. 1887. "On the Bronze Implements found in the East Riding of Yorkshire", Proceedings of the Yorkshire Geological and Polytechnic Society 9, 426-427 .
Boynton, T. 1911. "Skipsea earthworks", Yorkshire Archaeological and Topographical Journal 21, 188-189.

References

British curators
1919 deaths
Yorkshire Museum people
Members of the Yorkshire Philosophical Society
Fellows of the Society of Antiquaries of London
Fellows of the Society of Antiquaries of Scotland
People from Bridlington
British archaeologists
Prehistorians